Toby Hawkins may refer to:

Toby Hawkins (musician) on August and Everything After
Toby Hawkins, character in Humans (TV series)